The Men's under-23 road race of the 2012 UCI Road World Championships was a cycling event that took place on 22 September 2012 in Limburg, the Netherlands.

Final classification

References 

Men's under-23 road race
UCI Road World Championships – Men's under-23 road race